Ualá is a mobile app used for managing a Mastercard prepaid debit card in Argentina. The app was founded by Pierpaolo Barbieri and investors include Point72 Ventures. Competitors include Argentinian digital bank Brubank, which provides transaction account services through their app.

As per other prepaid debit cards, the account holder pre-loads money onto the card and a bank account isn't required. Lost or stolen Mastercard Prepaid debit cards can be frozen from within the app.

References

Android (operating system) software
IOS software
Personal finance
Online financial services companies of Argentina